AnTuTu is a software benchmarking tool commonly used to benchmark smartphones and other devices. It is owned by Chinese company Cheetah Mobile.

Operations
The company developing the software is based in Chaoyang District, Beijing, and was cofounded by Chinese entrepreneurs Shào Yīng (邵英) and Liáng Bīn (梁斌).They started multi-platform development, releasing a linux version in Mayand a windows version with ray tracing support in August.But note that the linux version currently only supports the x86 architecture.

Circumvention
The AnTuTu benchmark is so common that some hardware manufacturers have cheated on the benchmark, which made the benchmark unreliable.
In response to cheating, AnTuTu created a new benchmark, called AnTuTu X, which made it more difficult for manufacturers to cheat on the benchmark.

Despite the changes introduced by AnTuTu X, cheating continued to be rampant; for instance, in 2021, AnTuTu delisted (and for three months, banned) the Realme GT after evidence was discovered that the phone was found to have used delay tactics in multithreading performance tests, as well as modifying the reference JPEG image for image processing tests.

Versions 

 Versions of AnTuTu

References

External links 

  
  

Benchmarks (computing)
Chinese brands
Companies based in Beijing
Privately held companies of China